Samsong station is a subway station on Ilsan Line of Korail. The distance between this station and Wondang station is 5 km, so Wonheung station opened since December 27, 2014 between Wondang station and this station.

Station layout

Passengers

References

Seoul Metropolitan Subway stations
Railway stations opened in 1996
Metro stations in Goyang
Seoul Subway Line 3